Anna Odobescu (born 3 November 1991) is a Moldovan singer and actress. She represented her country at the Eurovision Song Contest 2019 with her song "Stay", after winning the national selection show O melodie pentru Europa on 2 March 2019. She failed to qualify from the semi-finals. In 2020, she appeared in the Netflix film Eurovision Song Contest: The Story Of Fire Saga, playing herself.

Discography

Singles

References 

Living people
1991 births
21st-century Moldovan women singers
Eurovision Song Contest entrants of 2019
Eurovision Song Contest entrants for Moldova